HMNZS Te Kaha (F77) is one of ten  frigates, and one of two serving in the Royal New Zealand Navy (RNZN). The name Te Kaha is Māori, meaning 'fighting prowess' or 'strength' (for further information on this term, see Kaha).

Design and construction

During the mid-1980s, the RNZN began considering the replacement of their four  frigates. Around the same time, a deterioration in New Zealand-United States relations forced the New Zealand government to improve ties with local nations. As the Royal Australian Navy was seeking to replace their s with ships nearly identical to what the RNZN wanted, the two nations decided to collaborate on the acquisition in early 1987. Tenders had been requested in 1986, and 12 ship designs (including an airship) were submitted. By August 1987, these were narrowed down in October to Blohm + Voss's MEKO 200 design, the M class (later ) offered by Royal Schelde, and a scaled-down Type 23 frigate proposed by Yarrow Shipbuilders. In 1989, the Australian government announced that Melbourne-based shipbuilder AMECON (which became Tenix Defence) would build the modified MEKO 200 design. However, the decision to buy the frigates had been highly controversial in New Zealand, primarily because of the cost of purchasing frigate-type ships, plus the idea that the high-capability warships would be too few and too overspecialised for the fisheries and economic exclusion zone (EEZ) patrols expected to be the RNZN's core operations. Despite ongoing debate, the New Zealand government agreed to purchase two frigates in addition to the RAN's eight, and had an option for two more. This option expired in 1997 without New Zealand exercising it; there were proposals to buy a new or second-hand Anzac outside the terms of the original contract, but a lack of political support stopped this developing, and the number built for the RNZN remained at two. The drop in capability and the issue of tying up the Anzacs on EEZ patrols when they could be deployed more suitably elsewhere were factors leading to the RNZN's Project Protector acquisition program.

The Anzacs are based on Blohm + Voss' MEKO 200 PN (or ) frigates, modified to meet Australian and New Zealand specifications and maximise the use of locally built equipment. Each frigate has a  full load displacement. The ships are fitted with a Combined Diesel or Gas (CODOG) propulsion machinery layout, consisting of two controllable-pitch propellers driven by a single General Electric LM2500-30 gas turbine and two MTU diesel engines: initially the TB83 model, but these were replaced in 2009 with more powerful TB93s. The standard ship's company of an Anzac consists of 22 officers and 141 sailors.

As designed, the main armament for the frigate is a 5-inch 54 calibre Mark 45 gun, supplemented by an eight-cell Mark 41 vertical launch system for RIM-7 Sea Sparrow surface to air missiles, two  machine guns, and two Mark 32 triple torpedo tube sets firing Mark 46 torpedoes. They were also designed for but not with a close-in weapons system (a Phalanx CIWS installed shortly after the frigate's completion, supplemented by two Mini Typhoons from 2006 onwards), two quad-canister Harpoon missile launchers, and a second Mark 41 launcher (neither of which have been added to the New Zealand ships). The New Zealand Anzacs initially operated with a Westland Wasp helicopter, which were later replaced by Kaman SH-2 Seasprites, then Kaman SH-2G Super Seasprite helicopters.

Te Kaha was laid down at Williamstown, Victoria on 19 September 1994. The ship was assembled from six hull modules and six superstructure modules; the superstructure modules were fabricated in Whangarei, New Zealand, and hull modules were built at both Williamstown and Newcastle, New South Wales, with final integration at Williamstown. She was launched on 22 July 1995, and commissioned into the RNZN on 22 July 1997. In early 2002, microscopic cracks in Te Kahas bilge keel and hull plating were discovered. This problem, which was common to the first four ships of the Anzac class, was later rectified.

Operational history
In 1999, Te Kaha pursued Patagonian Toothfish poachers in the Ross Dependency, participated in the INTERFET multinational deployment to East Timor from 19 to 26 September, and operated as part of the Multinational Interception Force in the Persian Gulf.

The frigate was also involved in the Solomon Islands conflict during 2000 and 2001, with several periods as guardship at the capital, Honiara.

In 2002, Te Kaha returned to the Persian Gulf, this time as part of Operation Enduring Freedom, after a four-month flag-showing deployment in Asian waters. The frigate was replaced in the Gulf by Te Mana in early 2003.

In 2010 Te Kaha and  became the first RNZN ships to Visit the USA Mainland since the dissolution of the ANZUS treaty.

In 2012 Te Kaha attended Exercise RIMPAC.

On 16 February 2015, Te Kaha sailed from New Zealand to Gallipoli, ahead of the 100th Anniversary of the landings there during World War I. After completion of this event, the frigate sailed for the Gulf of Oman where she was assigned to anti-piracy patrols. Following this, she sailed back to New Zealand after participating in the Australian-led exercise Exercise Talisman Saber. The ship returned to New Zealand on 2 August 2015 to family members, senior naval staff and the Maori Cultural group who performed a haka. Also involved in Talisman Saber 2015 was the multi-role vessel,  and the fleet tanker, HMNZS Endeavour.

In June 2017, the ship's deployment in the western Pacific was extended to provide support to the US 7th Fleet after  collided with the container ship , killing seven sailors and causing extensive damage to the destroyer.

In September 2021  and Te Kaha sailed for an international defence exercise in South East Asia and also interact with the United Kingdom’s Carrier Strike Group (CSG) as it conducts engagement activities in the Indo-Pacific region.

Refit 
In March 2018, Te Kaha arrived in Victoria, British Columbia to undergo a major upgrade of her combat management system to the Lockheed Martin CMS 330, as well as replacing the RIM-7 Sea Sparrow with the new Sea Ceptor surface-to-air missile. The upgrade is expected to cost NZD639 million. In September 2020, the refit of Te Kaha was reportedly complete and the ship began post-upgrade sea trials in preparation for a return to active service.

In December 2020 Te Kaha completed initial refit upgrades and sea trials and sailed back to Auckland,  arriving at the Devonport Naval Base on the 20th of December. While she has finished the upgrades she has not completed her maintenance routine.

Honours
In November 2018, the US Navy awarded Te Kaha the Meritorious Unit Commendation for supporting the 7th Fleet after the Fitzgerald collision.

Gallery

See also
 Frigates of the Royal New Zealand Navy

Citations

References

Books

Journal articles

External links
 "Te Kaha", Royal New Zealand Navy. Retrieved 8 February 2007.
 "Navy ship to support Auckland Anniversary Day", press release of 24 January 2007 by NZ Defence Force. Retrieved 8 February 2007.

Anzac-class frigates of the Royal New Zealand Navy
Frigates of New Zealand
Ships built in Victoria (Australia)
1995 ships